Visa requirements for Ugandan citizens are administrative entry restrictions imposed on citizens of Uganda by the authorities of other states. As of 2 July 2019, Ugandan citizens had visa-free or visa on arrival access to 65 countries and territories, ranking the Ugandan passport 79th in terms of travel freedom according to the Henley Passport Index.

Visa requirements map

Visa requirements

Dependent, Disputed, or Restricted territories
Unrecognized or partially recognized countries

Dependent and autonomous territories

See also 

 Visa policy of Uganda
 Ugandan passport
Visa requirements for Burundian citizens
Visa requirements for Congo DR citizens
Visa requirements for Kenyan citizens
Visa requirements for Rwandan citizens
Visa requirements for South Sudanese citizens
Visa requirements for Tanzanian citizens

References and Notes
References

Notes

Ugandan
Foreign relations of Uganda